Eccymatoge is a genus of moths in the family Geometridae.

Species
 Eccymatoge aorista (Turner, 1907)
 Eccymatoge callizona (Lower, 1894)
 Eccymatoge fulvida (Turner, 1907)
 Eccymatoge morphna Turner, 1922

References

 Eccymatoge at Markku Savela's Lepidoptera and Some Other Life Forms
 Natural History Museum Lepidoptera genus database

Larentiinae
Geometridae genera